Anne Devlin is a 1984 Irish drama film directed by Pat Murphy. It was entered into the 14th Moscow International Film Festival.

Cast
 Brid Brennan as Anne Devlin
 Bosco Hogan as Robert Emmet
 Des McAleer as James Hope
 Gillian Hackett as Rose Hope
 David Kelly as Dr. Trevor
 Ian McElhinney as Major Sirr
 Chris O'Neill as Thomas Russell
 Pat Leavy as Mrs. Devlin
 Marie Conmee as Mrs. Darby
 John Cowley as Devlin

References

External links
 

1984 films
1984 drama films
Irish drama films
English-language Irish films
1980s English-language films